Zaki Baydoun (born 1981) is a Lebanese poet and painter. Born in Tyre, he studied philosophy at the Université de St Denis in Paris. He has published several collections of poetry and short stories. As an artist, he has also exhibited in Lebanon. In 2009, he was named as one of the Beirut39, a selection of the best young writers in the Arab world.

References

Lebanese poets
1981 births
Living people
People from Tyre, Lebanon
Date of birth missing (living people)